Craig Nelson Yeast (born November 20, 1976) is an American gridiron football coach and former player. He is the head football coach at Kentucky Wesleyan College, a position he has held since December 2018.He now is the head coach of the Mercer County Titans. Yeast played professionally as a wide receiver and kick returner in National Football League (NFL) with the Cincinnati Bengals and the New York Jets and in the Canadian Football League (CFL) with the Hamilton Tiger-Cats and Saskatchewan Roughriders. He played college football at the University of Kentucky.

High school career
Yeast played quarterback and running back for Harrodsburg High School in Harrodsburg, Kentucky. Harrodsburg High School merged with Mercer County Senior High School in 2006.

College career
Yeast played college football at the University of Kentucky for four seasons, from 1995 to 1998. When he graduated, Yeast was the all-time leader in career receptions in the history of the Southeastern Conference, with 208 catches, and was second in career receiving yards with 2,899. In 1998, he returned three kickoffs and one punt for touchdowns. As a senior, he was a third-team All-American according to College Football News, and was also a consensus All-Southeastern Conference first-team selection  and a semi-finalist for the Fred Biletnikoff Award. Yeast was also a member of the Phi Beta Sigma fraternity.

NFL career
Yeast was the third pick of the fourth round in the 1999 NFL draft. He played for the Cincinnati Bengals and the New York Jets. His best NFL season came as a Bengal in 2000 when he caught 24 passes for 301 yards (12.5 average) and had one rushing attempt for 15 yards.

CFL career
In four seasons with the Hamilton Tiger-Cats, Yeast had 158 pass receptions for 2,706 yards (17.1 yards per catch) and 13 touchdowns. In 2004 Yeast had 59 catches for 1,184 yards (20.1 average) and 8 touchdowns. In 2005 Yeast had 65 catches for 1,010 yards (15.5 average) and 3 touchdowns. On July 29, 2006, Yeast was released by the Tiger-Cats. Following his years as a Tiger-Cat, Yeast had a short stint with the Saskatchewan Roughriders.

Coaching career
After one season as head coach at Bryan Station High School in Lexington, Kentucky, Yeast became wide receiver coach at Tiffin University in Tiffin, Ohio. On March 3, 2014, he became the head football coach at Fremont Ross High School in Fremont, Ohio. December 2018, Yeast was hired as the head coach at Kentucky Wesleyan College in Owensboro, Kentucky. February 15, 2022, Yeast takes over the head coaching job for the Mercer County Titans in his hometown of Harrodsburg, Kentucky

Head coaching record

College

References

External links
 Kentucky Wesleyan profile
 Franklin (IN) profile
 

1976 births
Living people
American football return specialists
American football wide receivers
Canadian football return specialists
Canadian football wide receivers
Cincinnati Bengals players
Franklin Grizzlies football coaches
Hamilton Tiger-Cats players
New York Jets players
Kentucky Horsemen players
Kentucky Wildcats football players
Tiffin Dragons football coaches
High school football coaches in Kentucky
High school football coaches in Ohio
People from Danville, Kentucky
People from Mercer County, Kentucky
Players of American football from Kentucky
African-American coaches of American football
African-American players of American football
African-American players of Canadian football
21st-century African-American sportspeople
20th-century African-American sportspeople